Charles Brun may refer to:
Charles Brun (France) (1821–1897), French engineer and politician
Charles Brun (Denmark) (1866–1919), Danish politician, Finance Minister of Denmark between 1908–1909

See also 
 Charles Le Brun (1619–1690), French painter and art theorist